Neil Young (born 1945) is a Canadian singer/song writer and guitarist

Neil Young may also refer to:
 Neil Young (album), the debut album of Neil Young from 1969
 Neil Young (politician) (1936–2015), former Canadian politician
 Neil Young (judge), Australian judge
 Neil Young (footballer, born 1944) (1944–2011), English football winger
 Neil Young (footballer, born 1973), English football defender
 Neil Young (soccer, born 1979), Australian football goalkeeper
 Neil Young, co-founder and CEO of Ngmoco

Young, Neil